Heidi Milia Anderson is an American academic administrator serving as the president of the University of Maryland Eastern Shore since September 2018. She was previously the provost at Texas A&M University–Kingsville and the University of the Sciences.

Life 
Anderson is from Gary, Indiana. She completed a B.S. in pharmacy (1978) and a Ph.D. in pharmacy administration (1986) at the Purdue University College of Pharmacy. In 1982, she earned a M.S. in education at the Purdue University School of Education. Anderson was a first-generation college student. Anderson was the assistant director of the health careers opportunity center in the Purdue University College of Pharmacy from 1978 to 1982.

Anderson served as the assistant dean for education innovation at the University of Kentucky College of Pharmacy from January 2022 to July 2006. At the University of Kentucky, she was the associate provost for faculty affairs from August 2006 to July 2011 and the vice president and associate provost for institution effectiveness from July 2011 to June 2013. Kumble R. Subbaswamy served as a mentor of Anderson. From 1986 to 1989, Anderson was an assistant professor in the health science administration department at the University of Tennessee College of Pharmacy.  She joined Auburn University College of Pharmacy in 1989 as an assistant professor in the pharmacy care systems department. Anderson became an associate professor in 1993 and served as a professor and department chair from 1999 to 2002. 

Anderson was the provost and vice president of academic affairs at the University of the Sciences from July 2013 to August 2015. From September 2015 to September 2017, she joined the Texas A&M University–Kingsville in September 2015 as provost and vice president of academic affairs. From October 2017 to September 2018, she was the assistant to the president for special projects. 

Anderson became president of the University of Maryland Eastern Shore (UMES) on September 1, 2018, succeeding Juliette Bell. She is the fourth woman in the 21st-century to serve as president of UMES. In 2020, she received the Influential Marylander's Award and Maryland's Top 100 Women honor from the Daily Record. In 2022, Anderson became chair of the American Association of State Colleges and Universities.

References 

Living people
Year of birth missing (living people)
People from Gary, Indiana
African-American women academic administrators
Women heads of universities and colleges
Heads of universities and colleges in the United States
University of Maryland Eastern Shore faculty
Purdue University College of Pharmacy alumni
University of Kentucky faculty
University of Tennessee faculty
Auburn University faculty
University of the Sciences faculty
Texas A&M University faculty
21st-century African-American academics
21st-century American academics
20th-century African-American academics
20th-century American academics
21st-century African-American women
20th-century African-American women
21st-century African-American scientists
21st-century American women scientists